The No Code Tour was a concert tour by American rock band Pearl Jam to support their fourth album, No Code.

History
Pearl Jam promoted No Code with tours in North America and Europe in the fall of 1996. The short tour of North America focused on the East Coast of the United States. As with Vitalogy, very little touring was done in the United States to promote No Code because of the band's refusal to play in Ticketmaster's venue areas. The band chose to use alternate ticketing companies for the shows. Nevertheless, the band toured the United States playing shows in locations such as Downing Stadium on Randall's Island and The Meadows in Hartford, Connecticut. Chicago Bulls player Dennis Rodman attended the band's September 26, 1996 show in Augusta, Maine at the Civic Center, and during the climax of "Alive" came onstage to offer Vedder some red wine. To the excitement of the crowd, Vedder responded by hopping on Rodman's back and riding him piggyback style across the stage while singing. Rodman later received a Walkman carved with Vedder's initials containing the concert recording and cited this as one of his most thrilling experiences. A European tour followed in the fall of 1996. The band's November 3, 1996 show in Berlin, Germany at Deutschlandhalle was broadcast on many radio stations worldwide. This show is commonly called "Checkpoint Charlie" by fans.

During the North American tour fans complained about the difficulty in obtaining tickets and the use of non-Ticketmaster venues, which were judged to be out-of-the-way and impersonal. Guitarist Stone Gossard stated that there was "a lot of stress associated with trying to tour at that time" and that "it was growing more and more difficult to be excited about being part of the band." He added, "Ticketmaster, as monopolistic as it may be, is very efficient so we weren't playing the venues we wanted to play." This is their last full-date tour with Jack Irons, who later departed from the band during their 1998's Yield Tour.

Tour dates
Information taken from various sources.

Festivals and other miscellaneous performances
This concert was a part of the "Bridge School Benefit"

Cancellations and rescheduled shows

Band members
Jeff Ament – bass guitar
Stone Gossard – rhythm guitar, lead guitar, vocals on "Mankind"
Mike McCready – lead guitar
Eddie Vedder – lead vocals, rhythm guitar, harmonica
Jack Irons – drums

Songs performed

Originals
"Alive"
"Animal"
"Around the Bend"
"Better Man"
"Black"
"Black, Red, Yellow"
"Blood"
"Corduroy"
"Daughter"
"Dissident"
"Elderly Woman Behind the Counter in a Small Town"
"Even Flow"
"Footsteps"
"Glorified G"
"Go"
"Habit"
"Hail, Hail"
"I Got Id"
"Immortality"
"In My Tree"
"Indifference"
"Jeremy"
"Last Exit"
"Long Road"
"Lukin"
"Mankind"
"MFC" (snippet)
"Not for You"
"Nothingman"
"Oceans"
"Off He Goes"
"Once"
"Porch"
"Present Tense"
"Rats"
"Rearviewmirror"
"Red Mosquito"
"Release"
"Satan's Bed"
"Smile"
"Sometimes"
"Spin the Black Circle"
"State of Love and Trust"
"Tremor Christ"
"W.M.A." (snippet)
"Wash"
"Whipping"
"Who You Are"
"Yellow Ledbetter"

Covers
"Androgynous Mind" (Sonic Youth) (snippet)
"Another Brick in the Wall" (Pink Floyd) (snippet)
"Bull in the Heather" (Sonic Youth) (snippet)
"Cinnamon Girl" (Neil Young) (snippet)
"Cut My Hair" (The Who) (snippet)
"Fame" (David Bowie) (snippet)
"Happiness Is a Warm Gun" (The Beatles) (snippet)
"Heaven" (Talking Heads) (snippet)
"Hunger Strike" (Temple of the Dog) (snippet)
"I Am a Patriot" (Steven Van Zandt)
"I Believe in Miracles" (Ramones) (snippet)
"I Can't Explain" (The Who)
"I'm One" (The Who) (snippet)
"The Kids Are Alright" (The Who)
"Leaving Here" (Edward Holland, Jr.)
"Little Wing" (Jimi Hendrix) (snippet)
"My Generation" (The Who)
"No More Pain" (Embrace) (snippet)
"The Noise of Carpet" (Stereolab) (snippet)
"The Real Me" (The Who) (snippet)
"Roadhouse Blues" (The Doors)
"Rockin' in the Free World" (Neil Young)
"Save It for Later" (The Beat) (snippet)
"Song X" (Neil Young) (snippet)
"Suck You Dry" (Mudhoney) (snippet)
"Young Man Blues" (Mose Allison) (snippet)

References

1996 concert tours
Pearl Jam concert tours